Perfect Machine is the thirty-seventh album by jazz pianist Herbie Hancock. It was the third and final album in Hancock’s series co-produced by Bill Laswell. Guests include bassist Bootsy Collins.

Background
The album was produced with Bill Laswell and performed with Bootsy Collins, Leroy "Sugarfoot" Bonner of the Ohio Players, and Grand Mixer DXT. It marked the end of his "Rockit" phase in the 1980s. Richard S. Ginnell at AllMusic called the album "mostly thumping, funk-drenched techno-pop".

Track listing
All songs by Hancock, Laswell, Collins and Bonner, except where noted.

"Perfect Machine" (Hancock, Laswell, Skopelitis) - 6:35
"Obsession" - 5:20
"Vibe Alive" (Hancock, Laswell, Collins, Bonner, Mico Wave) - 5:26
"Beat Wise" - 5:52
"Maiden Voyage/P. Bop" - 6:34
"Chemical Residue" (Hancock) - 6:01
"Vibe Alive" (extended dance mix) - 8:13
"Beat Wise" (12-inch edit) - 6:28

Personnel
Musicians
 Herbie Hancock – piano, Fairlight CMI Series I & II, Rhodes Chroma, Macintosh Plus, Yamaha DX1, Yamaha DX7 and DX7IIFD, Kurzweil K250, Yamaha TX816, Oberheim Matrix–12, Akai S900, vocoder
 Jeff Bova, Pete Sturge – synth programming
 Bootsy Collins – bass guitar, vocoder
 Mico Wave – Minimoog bass, talk box, vocoder
 Pete Sturge - keyboards, samples and editing
 Nicky Skopelitis – Fairlight drums
 Grand Mixer DXT – turntables, sound effects
 Leroy "Sugarfoot" Bonner – vocals

Production
 Herbie Hancock – producer
 Bill Laswell – producer
 Tony Meilandt – associate producer
 Martin Bisi, Mike Krowiak, Dave Jerden, Billy Yodelman, Bryan Bell – engineers
 Dave Jerden – mixing
 Howie Weinberg – mastering

References

1988 albums
Columbia Records albums
Herbie Hancock albums
Albums produced by Bill Laswell